Christopher Cook (born October 1, 1974) is a Canadian sailor from Toronto, Ontario who competes in the Finn class.

In 2005, Cook won a bronze medal at the Gold Cup. At the 2008 Summer Olympics, he finished in fifth place.

References

1974 births
Living people
Canadian male sailors (sport)
Olympic sailors of Canada
Sportspeople from Toronto
Sailors at the 2008 Summer Olympics – Finn